František Pitra (13 November 1932 – 2 January 2018) was the Prime Minister of the Czech Socialist Republic (then part of Czechoslovakia) from October 11, 1988, through February 6, 1990. Like his four predecessors, he was a member of the Communist Party of Czechoslovakia. Pitra attended an agricultural engineer in the years 1951–1955 graduated from the University of Agriculture in Brno. He obtained his degree in agricultural engineer from the University of Agriculture in Brno (today Mendel University Brno).

References 

1932 births
2018 deaths
People from Chrudim District
Members of the Central Committee of the Communist Party of Czechoslovakia
Members of the Chamber of the People of Czechoslovakia (1976–1981)
Members of the Chamber of the People of Czechoslovakia (1981–1986)
Members of the Chamber of the People of Czechoslovakia (1986–1990)
Czech communists
Prime Ministers of the Czech Socialist Republic
Czechoslovak engineers
Mendel University Brno alumni
Communist Party of Czechoslovakia prime ministers